Unforgettable is an original jazz compilation by Nat King Cole. It was initially released on a 10 inch LP in 1952, and it was reissued on a 12 inch LP in 1954.

Track listing 
"Unforgettable" (Irving Gordon) - 3:13
"A Portrait of Jennie" (Gordon Burdge, J. Russell Robinson) - 3:09
"What'll I Do?" (Irving Berlin) - 3:05
"Lost April" (Eddie DeLange, Emil Newman, Hubert Spencer) - 2:58
"Answer Me, My Love" (Fred Rauch, Carl Sigman, Gerhard Winkler) - 2:38
"Hajji Baba (Persian Lament)" (Dimitri Tiomkin, Ned Washington) - 3:07
"Too Young" (Sylvia Dee, Sidney Lippman) - 3:13
"Mona Lisa" (Jay Livingston, Ray Evans) - 3:16
"(I Love You) For Sentimental Reasons" (William Best, Deek Watson) - 2:54
"Red Sails in the Sunset" (Jimmy Kennedy, Hugh Williams) - 3:17
"Pretend" (Dan Belloc, Lew Douglass, Frank LaVere, Cliff Parman) - 2:44
"Make Her Mine" (Chester Conn, Sammy Gallop) - 2:57
tracks 5, 6, 11 and 12 were not part of the original 10 inch LP release but were added to the 1954 (and later) releases.

Personnel 
Nat King Cole – vocals
The Nat King Cole Trio – on "I Love You for Sentimental Reasons," "What'll I Do?" and "Lost April"
The Carlyle Hall Strings – on "Lost April" and "Portrait of Jennie"
Les Baxter's Orchestra – on "Mona Lisa" and "Too Young" 
Pete Rugolo's Orchestra – on "Red Sails in the Sunset"  
Nelson Riddle's Orchestra – on "Unforgettable," "Pretend," "Answer Me My Love," "Make Her Mine" and "Hajji Baba"
Lee Gillette – producer

Certifications

References 

Capitol H-357 (1952 release, 10 inch, 8 tracks)
Capitol T-357 (1954 release, 12 inch, 12 tracks)

External links
A Pile o' Cole Nat King Cole Website
discogs.com
Personnel listing from Rato Records

1954 compilation albums
Nat King Cole albums
Capitol Records compilation albums